John J. Diehl, Jr. (born August 28, 1965) is an American attorney and a Republican former member of the Missouri House of Representatives.  He represented the 89th district, which includes Ballwin, Chesterfield, Country Life Acres, Crystal Lake Park, Des Peres, Frontenac, Huntleigh, Kirkwood, Ladue, Manchester, and Town and Country, from 2009 to 2015. Prior to redistricting he represented the 87th district from 2009-2012. Diehl was elected Speaker of the Missouri House of Representatives in 2013 and took office in January 2015. Diehl resigned on May 14, 2015 after a scandal came to light regarding inappropriate messages exchanged with an intern.

Early life and political career
Diehl graduated from De Smet Jesuit High School in Creve Coeur in 1983.  He graduated from the University of Missouri in 1987 with a degree in political science.  He received a J.D. degree from St. Louis University in 1991.  Diehl is married, has three sons, and attends Our Lady of the Pillar parish in Creve Coeur.

Diehl was named Town and Country and Frontenac Chamber of Commerce's 2006 businessman of the year and was on the Town and Country and Frontenac Chamber of Commerce executive committee from 2004-2007. He has been chairman of the St. Louis County Board of Election Commissioners, chairman of the Town and Country Police Commission, chairman of Town and Country Conservation Commission, a member of the Town and Country Architectural Review Board, chairman of the Town and Country Longview House Renovation Committee, on the Governor's Advisory Council on DWI, Town and Country ombudsman to the West County EMS and Fire Protection District, and a member of the International Association of Clerks, Recorders, Election Officials and Treasurers Election Center.  He was also a member of the Town and Country Board of Aldermen from the first ward.  He was in that position from 2003–2005 and he served as president of the board from 2004-2005.

Career in the Missouri House
In 2008, he was elected to serve in the Missouri House of Representatives.  He was chairman of the powerful Rules Committee and Special Standing Committee on Redistricting and served as House Majority Floor Leader in 2013.  In September 2013, Rep. Diehl was elected Speaker-Designee, and became the Speaker of the Missouri House in 2015.

Committee assignments

2010
Special Standing Committee on Redistricting (Chairman)
House Elections Committee (Vice-chairman)

2013
Ex officio member of all committees of the House
Ethics (Chairman)
Joint Committee on Tax Policy
Leadership for Missouri Issue Development
Interim Committee on Election Procedures

2014
Ex officio member of all committees of the House
Ethics (Chairman)
Joint Committee on Tax Policy
Leadership for Missouri Issue Development
Interim Committee on Election Procedures

2015
Ex officio member of all committees of the House
Joint Committee on Tax Policy

Sexting controversy and resignation
On April 24, 2015, The Kansas City Star contacted Diehl about exchanges of sexually suggestive text messages between himself and a female House intern, who was then a college freshman. The internship program had been abruptly canceled in April 2015 after Missouri Southern State University discovered an "unspecified incident" with a student, which analysts say was likely Diehl's affair. A few hours after the Star published a report of the exchanges on May 13, Diehl admitted responsibility, stating, "I will begin immediately working to restore the trust of those closest to me and getting back to the important work that is required in the final days of session." However, he resigned May 14. He was replaced by Todd Richardson of Poplar Bluff.

Electoral history

References

External links
 JohnDiehl.org
 Official Missouri House of Representatives profile
 Interest Group Ratings
 Campaign Finance Information

1965 births
Living people
Republican Party members of the Missouri House of Representatives
Politicians from St. Louis
Saint Louis University alumni
University of Missouri alumni
Speakers of the Missouri House of Representatives